Leon Bridges FAIA (born August 18, 1932, in Los Angeles) is an American architect, and professor at Morgan State University.

Early life

Bridges was born in the East Los Angeles, California neighborhood of Boyle Heights to a mother who was a postal worker and a father who worked various jobs. He met his mentor, architect Paul Williams, while a student at Adams Junior High School. Bridges earned his high school diploma from Dorsey High School in 1950 where he was a member of the track team.

Bridges went on to attend East Los Angeles Junior College, Los Angeles City College and the University of California, Los Angeles before being drafted into the military in 1952 (whole studying at UCLA).

Life
He graduated with a bachelor's of architecture from the University of Washington in 1960  and from Loyola College of Maryland with an MBA in 1984.

He worked for Bridges/Burke, in Seattle, and in Baltimore.
He was principal at The Leon Bridges Company, and Sheladia/Bridges.

References

1932 births
Living people
University of Washington College of Built Environments alumni
Loyola College (Montreal) alumni
Morgan State University faculty
20th-century American architects
University of California, Los Angeles alumni
Susan Miller Dorsey High School alumni
People from Boyle Heights, Los Angeles
Los Angeles City College alumni
East Los Angeles College alumni